Milan Jovanović (Serbian Cyrillic: Милан Јовановић, born 14 October 1983), is a Serbian football striker.

References

External links

Living people
1983 births
Serbian footballers
FK Radnički Niš players
FK Rad players
FK Sloga Kraljevo players
Association football forwards
Serbian expatriate footballers
Expatriate footballers in Albania
Expatriate footballers in Myanmar
OFK Niš players
FK Metalac Gornji Milanovac players
FK Car Konstantin players
FK Vlasina players
FK Radnički Pirot players
Expatriate footballers in Kazakhstan
FC Taraz players
FK BSK Borča players
FK Sinđelić Niš players
Yangon United F.C. players
KF Tirana players
FK Bregalnica Štip players
Expatriate footballers in North Macedonia